Galloglass, or Gallowglass, were a type of Gaelic-Norse warrior.

Galloglass may also refer to:

Gallowglass (novel), a novel by Barbara Vine
Gallowglass (TV series), a miniseries based on the novel
Galloglass, 1521 painting by Albrecht Dürer